Jenna Laukkanen (born 2 March 1995) is a Finnish swimmer with a specialty in the breaststroke. She currently represents Team Iron in the International Swimming League.

Laukkanen competed in the 2011 European Junior Swimming Championships, winning a bronze medal in the 50m breaststroke and a silver medal in the 100m breaststroke. She competed for Team Finland at the 2012 Summer Olympics. Her final ranking in the 100m breaststroke was 34th and 32nd in the 200m breaststroke. In the 2015 European Short Course Swimming Championships, Laukkanen won gold medals in the 50m and 100m breaststroke. At the 2016 European Aquatics Championships, she won bronze medals in the 50m breaststroke and the 4×100m medley. She competed for Team Finland at the 2016 Summer Olympics in Rio de Janeiro, Brazil.

International Swimming League 
In 2019 she was member of the 2019 International Swimming League representing Team Iron.

References

Finnish female medley swimmers
Swimmers at the 2012 Summer Olympics
Swimmers at the 2016 Summer Olympics
Olympic swimmers of Finland
1995 births
Living people
Finnish female breaststroke swimmers
People from Kuhmo
Sportspeople from Kainuu
20th-century Finnish women
21st-century Finnish women